Maximilian Ellis Ugrai (born 28 July 1995) is a German professional basketball player for MLP Academics Heidelberg of the Basketball Bundesliga.

Career 
Ugrai has already participated as a starter with the German U16 and U18 team at European Championships. In 2015, Ugrai was nominated for the first time for a training course for the national team.

On June 10, 2017, Ugrai signed with the German team Science City Jena. He averaged 7.4 points a game in 34 Bundesliga contests during the 2017-18 season and moved to fellow Bundesliga team Ratiopharm Ulm in May 2018.

On August 7, 2020, he has signed with Eisbären Bremerhaven of the German ProA.

On June 15, 2021, he has signed with Academics Heidelberg of the Basketball Bundesliga.

Career statistics

BBL regular season

BBL playoffs

References

External links
Team Profile
German Basketball Federation Profile
Eurobasket.com Profile

1995 births
Living people
Eisbären Bremerhaven players
German men's basketball players
People from Bad Mergentheim
Sportspeople from Stuttgart (region)
Ratiopharm Ulm players
S.Oliver Würzburg players
Science City Jena players
Small forwards
USC Heidelberg players